The 2016 EBSA European Under-18 Snooker Championship was an amateur snooker tournament that took place from 7 February to 12 February 2016 in Wrocław, Poland  It was the 1st edition of the EBSA European Under-18 Snooker Championships.

The final was notable for being an all Welsh affair between Jackson Page and Tyler Rees as well as Welsh referee Peter Thomas officiating the match. The tournament was eventually won by number 15 seed Tyler Rees who defeated his fellow countryman Page 5–2 in the final. As a result, Rees was awarded with a place in the qualifying rounds for the 2016 World Snooker Championship.

Results

Round 1
Best of 5 frames

References

2016 in snooker
Snooker amateur tournaments
Sport in Wrocław
2016 in Polish sport
International sports competitions hosted by Poland
February 2016 sports events in Europe